The Amarillo Gorillas were a minor league hockey team based in Amarillo, Texas. The team was most recently affiliated with the now defunct Central Hockey League (CHL) from 2001–10. The Gorillas began play in 1996 as the Amarillo Rattlers in the Western Professional Hockey League (WPHL) until the WPHL was bought by the CHL in 2001. They would continue to use the Rattlers name until an ownership change in 2002, composed of local businessmen Bill Tolliver, Gary Thach, Joe Gammesfelter, Daryl Felsberg, Kevin Moon, Jay Hedrick, and Shaughn Ogrady. As the Rattlers, the team frequently finished at the bottom of the WPHL and CHL divisions, but made the playoffs four straight years after becoming the Gorillas until the 2006–2007 season. The Gorillas played in the Amarillo Civic Center. The team's most recent head coach was Brian Pellerin.

On May 19, 2010, the Gorillas announced they had ceased operations. However, hockey would remain in Amarillo, as the North American Hockey League, a Junior A league affiliated with USA Hockey, named the Amarillo Bulls started play in the 2010–2011 season.

Season records

Western Professional Hockey League

Central Hockey League

References

1996 establishments in Texas
2010 disestablishments in Texas
Defunct Central Hockey League teams
Defunct ice hockey teams in Texas
Ice hockey clubs established in 1996
Ice hockey teams in Texas
Sports clubs disestablished in 2010
Sports in Amarillo, Texas